Ching Win Publishing Co., Ltd. is a Taiwanese Publishing Group famous for its large manga selection, established 1964 in Taipei. Though it was initially aimed as general publishing company, it changed its principle to mainly publishing manga, light novels and pop culture magazines during the 1990s. In addition to translating Japanese manga and light novels, it also supports local Taiwanese authors as well.

Publications
 Manga Magazines
 
 Translated version of CoroCoro Comic (Shogakukan). But it also contents many manga from Shueisha and Kodansha along with some South Korean manhwa.
 
 Translated version of Shōnen Sunday (Shogakukan). Monthly.
 
 Translated version of Bessatsu Friend (Shogakukan). Monthly.
 CHING WIN BOY COMIC
 Monthly Shounen manga magazine.

 Other Magazines
 Many localized versions of Japanese magazines are released by Chingwin Publishing Group.
 Famitsu (Enterbrain)
 Dengeki Hobby Magazine (MediaWorks)
 With (Kodansha)
 Vivi (Kodansha)
 Cawaii! (Shufunotomosha)

 Light Novels
 Elite Novels 
 Translated versions of Super Dash Bunko and Cobalt Bunko from Shueisha.

See also
 List of companies of Taiwan

External links

 Chingwin Publishing Group
 CHiNGWiN Novel
 

1964 establishments in Taiwan
Mass media companies of Taiwan
Magazine publishing companies
Book publishing companies
Companies based in Taipei
Publishing companies of Taiwan
Companies established in 1964